The 1958–59 Scottish Cup was the 74th staging of Scotland's most prestigious football knockout competition. The Cup was won by St Mirren who defeated Aberdeen in the final.

First round

Replays

Second Replays

Second round

Replays

Third round

Quarter-finals

Semi-finals

Replays

Final

See also

1958–59 in Scottish football
1958–59 Scottish League Cup

Scottish Cup seasons
1958–59 in Scottish football
Scot